Issikiopteryx rotundiconcava is a moth in the family Lecithoceridae. It is found in China (Sichuan).

References

Moths described in 2008
Issikiopteryx
Moths of Asia